The Chinese Ambassador to Tanzania is the official representative of the People's Republic of China to the United Republic of Tanzania.

List of representatives

See also
China–Tanzania relations

References 

Tanzania
China
Ambassadors